António Aniceto Monteiro (1907–1980) was a mathematician born in Portuguese Angola who later emigrated to Brazil in 1945 and finally to Argentina in 1950. Monteiro is best known for establishing a school of algebraic logic at Universidad Nacional del Sur, Bahía Blanca, Argentina. His efforts to promote theoretical computer science research in Argentina were less successful.

After his undergraduate studies at the University of Lisbon (completed in 1930), Monteiro obtained a PhD at Sorbonne in 1936 under the advisement of Maurice Fréchet with a thesis in topology. In Portugal Monteiro was the main founder of the journal Portugaliae Mathematica in 1937.

In 1945 Monteiro moved to Brazil. There are two versions of why Monteiro left Portugal. The first version is that Monteiro and other Portuguese mathematicians like Ruy Luís Gomes fell foul of Salazar's regime for their political beliefs; some, like Gomes, were imprisoned; others, like Monteiro, were simply denied employment and practically forced to emigrate. The second version, supported by Monteiro's written documents, is that he was tired of the problems created by his fellow scholars that were blocking his attempts to modernize Mathematics in Portuguese universities.

Leopoldo Nachbin was one of Monteiro's Brazilian students. Monteiro's impact on Argentinean mathematics has been compared to that of Julio Rey Pastor.

Monographs 
 Monteiro, António "Sur les algèbres de Heyting symétriques." Portugaliae mathematica 39.1–4 (1980): 1–237.

References

Further reading
 http://www.matematica.uns.edu.ar/ixcongresomonteiro/Actas/cignoli.pdf
 http://www.genealogy.ams.org/id.php?id=107420


20th-century Portuguese mathematicians
1907 births
1980 deaths
Portuguese people in colonial Angola
Portuguese expatriates in France
Portuguese expatriates in Brazil
Portuguese emigrants to Argentina